Rough Aunties is a 2008 documentary film directed by Kim Longinotto about a group of 5 women of Operation Bobbi Bear who protect and care for abused, neglected and forgotten children in Durban, South Africa. It won the Grand Jury Prize in the 'World Cinema — Documentary' category at the 2009 Sundance Film Festival.

References

External links

 Rough Aunties at Women Make Movies

2008 films
British documentary films
Documentary films about child abuse
South African documentary films
Zulu-language films
2008 documentary films
Documentary films about women in Africa
Durban
Films directed by Kim Longinotto
Sundance Film Festival award winners
2000s English-language films
2000s British films